"Footsteps" is the only single taken from Melbourne Indie rock band  Dardanelles' debut album  Mirror Mirror released in 2007.

Background
The band claims the song was written in about 10 minutes and is the simplest track off the album. Originally planning to scrap the song, their producer convinced them to record it. The song received heavy rotation on Australian airwaves championed by radio stations Triple J and Sydney based FBi Radio making it the second most added track to alternative radio in Australia behind Yeah Yeah Yeahs.

Video clip

Melbourne based agency "Krozm" produced a video clip for the song featuring face-painted band members projected across various objects and highly surreal imagery reminiscent of Pink Floyd's video work.

Personnel
Josh Quinn-Watson (vocals, keyboard, samples)
Alex Cameron (guitar)
James Nicolson (bass)
Mitch McGregor (drums)

External links
 review by Taryn Davis
 Official Website
 Official MySpace

Notes

Dardanelles (band) songs
2007 singles
2007 songs